The East German Athletics Championships was an annual outdoor track and field competition organised by the East German Athletics Federation, which served as the East German national championships for the sport. The three- or four-day event was held in summer months, varying from late June to early September, and the venue changed on an annual basis.

The German Athletics Championships had a long history dating back to 1898. Following the division of Germany as part of the end of World War II, the organising body of the all-Germany championships, German Athletics Association, remained based in West Germany. As a result, a new national competition and sports body was created in East Germany, starting from 1948. This competition predated the formal formation of the country, thus the first two editions in 1948 and 1949 were known as Eastern Zone Athletics Championships, reflecting the Soviet occupied area of the country.

Events
The following athletics events were contested at the East German Championships:

Track running
100 metres, 200 metres, 400 metres, 800 metres, 1500 metres, 3000 metres (women only), 5000 metres (men only), 10,000 metres, marathon
Obstacle events
100 metres hurdles (women only), 110 metres hurdles (men only), 400 metres hurdles, 3000 metres steeplechase (men only)
Jumping events
Pole vault (men only), high jump, long jump, triple jump (men only)
Throwing events
Shot put, discus throw, javelin throw, hammer throw (men only)
Walking events
10 kilometres race walk (women only), 20 kilometres race walk (men only), 50 kilometres race walk (men only)
Combined events
Decathlon (men only), heptathlon (women only)

Women competed in the 80 metres hurdles event until 1968, when it was replaced with the new 100 m international standard race. The women's distance races were gradually added, with the 1500 m included in 1967, the 3000 m in 1976, the marathon in 1982, and finally the 10,000 m in 1985. The women's pentathlon was later expanded to the standard heptathlon. Steeplechase, pole vault, triple jump, hammer throw and the 50 km walk remained the preserve of men only over the championships' lifetime.

The men's programme also varied, with early editions featured walks over 10 km, 25 km and 30 km, as well as a 200 metres hurdles race from 1952 to 1965.

Editions

References

 

 
National athletics competitions
Athletics competitions in East Germany
1948 establishments in Germany
1990 disestablishments in East Germany
Recurring sporting events established in 1948
Recurring sporting events disestablished in 1990
Athletics
Defunct athletics competitions